9 1/2 Psychedelic Meditations on British Wrestling of the 1970s & Early '80s is a concept album by British alternative rock artist Luke Haines. The album has been initially released as a digital version on iTunes. It has later been adapted to CD and vinyl format.

Concept
As its title explicitly says, the songs have psychedelic arrangements and are talking about old wrestlers.

In the course of the album, Haines uses true wrestler names and uses them to make his fictional story. Haines's namedropping contains: Mark Rocco, Gorgeous George, Mick McManus, Shirley Crabtree, Pat Roach, Kendo Nagasaki, George Cannon and many more.

Track listing
All tracks written and composed by Luke Haines except for track 1 by Don Harper.
 "Inside The Restless Mind Of Rollerball Rocco" – 4:15
 "What The Plumber Saw" – 0:55
 "Gorgeous George" – 3:39
 "Rock Opera - In The Key Of Existential Misery" – 3:53
 "Linda's Head" – 2:38
 "Saturday Afternoon" – 2:35
 "Big Daddy Got A Casio VL Tone" – 2:30
 "I Am Catweazle" – 3:19
 "We Are Unusual Men" – 3:43
 "Haystacks' In Heaven" – 2:46

iTunes bonus track
 "Me And The Birds" – 2:50

Personnel
Music
 Luke Haines – guitar, piano, vocals, Songwrtting
 Don Harper – Songwriting (track 1)

Production
 Luke Haines – Producer
 George Shilling – Mastering

Design
 Sian Superman – Kendo Nagasaki Doll photography
 Luke Haines – Wrestlers Calendar painting
 Louise Mason - Sleeve, Layout

References

2011 albums
Luke Haines albums
Fantastic Plastic Records albums